The Peugeot Type 159 was a new model from Peugeot for 1919, part of a more consolidated post-World War I lineup.  It had a 1.5 L four-cylinder engine, seated four, and was sold for merely a year before replacement.

References
Peugeot Car Models from 1910-1949
Classic Car Show International

Type 159
Cars introduced in 1919
1920s cars